Tripura University is a central university, the main public government university of Tripura, India.

History
Higher education in Tripura has its beginning with Maharaja Bir Bikram College (MBBC), the first-degree college in the state, established in 1947, and affiliate to Calcutta University (CU). This was followed by Ramkrishna Mahavidyalaya in 1950, Iswar Chandra Vidyasagar College formerly known as Belonia College in 1964 and Ramthakur College in 1967, all affiliated to CU. No postgraduate college existed in Tripura, until in 1967 the University Grants Commission (UGC) sanctioned a post-graduate wing of CU, named Calcutta University Post graduate Centre (CUPGC), established in 1985. In 1987 Tripura University was established through the Tripura University Act, on the grounds of CUPGC.

In 2007 Tripura University was elevated to a central university under the Tripura University Act, 2006. Sudip Bandopadhya was appointed the first chancellor and Arunoday Saha as first vice-chancellor (VC). Saha was followed by Anjan Kumar Ghosh, followed by Vijaykumar Laxmikantrao Dharurkar who was appointed the third VC in July 2018.  In September 2019, Dharurkar resigned from his position under corruption allegations and replaced with acting VC Sangram Sinha. Sinha was replaced with acting VC Mahesh Kumar Singh in January 2020, who filled up the position until August 2020, when Ganga Prasad Prasain was appointed VC.

Location
The campus of Tripura University is situated at Suryamaninagar, 10 km away from the city centre of Agartala.

Affiliated colleges
Notable affiliated colleges include:
Ambedkar College
Dasaratha Deb Memorial College
Sachin Deb Barman Memorial Govt. Music College, Lichubagan
Government Degree College, Dharmanagar
Government Degree College, Kamalpur
Government Degree College, Khumulwng
Government Degree College, Teliamura
Government Degree College, Gandacharra
Holy Cross College, Agartala
Iswar Chandra Vidyasagar College, Belonia
Kabi Nazrul Mahavidyalaya, Sonamura
Michael Madhusudan Dutta College
Netaji Subhash Mahavidyalaya, Udaipur
Rabindranath Thakur Mahavidyalaya
Ramthakur College, Agartala
Ramkrishna Mahabhidyalay, Kailashar
Tripura Institute of Technology, Narsingarh
Tripura State Academy of Tribal Culture
Women's College, Agartala
Tripura Medical College, Hapaina
Agartala Government Medical College, Kunjaban

Controversy 

 Tripura University officials allege few faculty members "lack belongingness" as reason for failure to register name in NIRF ranking 2022. The department of distance education was shut down as a result of its failure to organize any convocation ceremonies and get an "A" grade from NAAC.
 After being caught on tape reportedly receiving bribes from a printing company in Kolkata in exchange for the award of a contract for 60 lakhs, the Vice Chancellor of Tripura University resigned. The Vice Chancellor, Vijaykumar Laxmikantrao Dharurkar, can be seen in the video negotiating a bribe of 10% of the contract, which was captured by local news channel News Vanguard as part of a sting operation called Operation White Collar and shared with NDTV.
 Top INPT officials called Governor Ramesh Bais to voice their displeasure and request his assistance in the matter. To resolve the controversial matter, the Governor subsequently met with Professor Ganga Prasad Prasain, Vice-Chancellor of Tripura University.
 Dr. Jai Kaushal, an assistant professor, has been placed on administrative leave by Tripura University's administration, which has also formed an "Investigation Committee" to investigate into the unfortunate episode that has drawn criticism for the school. The incident in issue happened when the professor asked the state's minister of higher education, Ratan Lal Nath, to shorten his address during the convocation ceremony.
 Classes at Tripura University have been suspended due to a dispute over employee salaries. According to reports, non-teaching employees hired through contracts were not receiving their due pay. In the meantime, the Executive Council and the University's Finance Committee had already approved higher pay arrangements.

References

External links

 
Universities in Tripura
Educational institutions established in 1947
Education in Agartala
1947 establishments in India
Central universities in India
Tripura University alumni
Colleges in Tripura